John Leith (31 May 1857 — 28 July 1928) was an Australian-born New Zealand cricketer who played for Otago. He was born in Melbourne and died in Dunedin.

Leith made a single first-class appearance for the team, during the 1880–81 season, against Canterbury. From the lower order, he scored 3 runs in the first innings in which he batted, and 2 not out in the second.

See also
 List of Otago representative cricketers

External links
John Leith at Cricket Archive

1857 births
1928 deaths
New Zealand cricketers
Otago cricketers
Burials at Dunedin Northern Cemetery